Mohammed Shabir, sometimes written Mohammed Shbeir, Mohammed Shubair or Mohammed Shubeir, (Arabic: محمد شبير; born 1946) was at one point the Prime Minister-in-waiting for the next Palestinian unity government. On November 13, 2006 senior Hamas officials in Syria announced that Hamas and Fatah had agreed on him.

Shabir, however, did not become Primime Minister. Salam Fayyad became Prime Minister when Hamas took over Gaza, in 2007, then Rami Hamdallah in 2013.

Shabir, 60, is originally from the Gaza town of Khan Yunis and received his doctorate in microbiology from Marshall University. He served for 15 years as president of The Islamic University in Gaza, retiring in August 2005. He and his wife have six children, and she is deputy to the minister of women's affairs. They live in Gaza City. Considered close to both Hamas and Fatah, Shabir frequently visited the late Yasser Arafat in his West Bank and Gaza Strip headquarters.

See also
 Ismail Haniyeh
 Palestinian Authority

References

External links
Michael Hastings, The Professor, Newsweek, November 17, 2006
Meet the Palestinians' New Leader Tim McGirk in Time, November 15, 2006.
Richard Boudreaux, Palestinians pick a new prime minister, Los Angeles Times, November 14, 2006
Palestinians agree on unity PM Al Jazeera, November 13, 2006.
Palestinian rivals 'agree new PM' BBC News, November 13, 2006.
U.S.-educated professor could lead Palestinians, CNN (AP) November 13, 2006
Shabir: I have sound relations with all parties Haaretz, November 13, 2006. Includes photo of Shabir.
Fatah, Hamas agree on Palestinian PM The Jerusalem Post, November 13, 2006. Includes photo of Shabir.

1946 births
Living people
People from Khan Yunis Governorate
Palestinian microbiologists
Marshall University alumni
Academic staff of the Islamic University of Gaza